Andokides or Andocides may refer to:
 Andocides, one of the Attic orators
 Andokides (potter), a sixth-century potter whose wares were decorated by the Andokides painter